Morgion may refer to:

 Morgion (band), an American doom-metal band
 a fictional entity in the Dragonlance universe